Bangkok Noi District Museum is a museum in Bangkok, Thailand. It is located on the Thonburi bank of the Chao Phraya River near the Bangkok Noi canal. It was established by the Bangkok Metropolitan Administration. Historically the area was a rest stop for foreign traders travelling by canal between Phra Nakhon Si Ayutthaya and Bangkok.

References

Museums in Bangkok
Local museums in Thailand
Bangkok Noi district